Garlitos is a municipality located in the province of Badajoz, Extremadura, Spain. As of 2018, the municipality has a population of 599 inhabitants.

References

Municipalities in the Province of Badajoz